Drumalee are a Gaelic football club from County Cavan in Ireland.  They are affiliated to Cavan GAA.

History
On 19 January 1935, the Anglo-Celt recorded the birth of Drumalee club as follows, it grew out of an informal meeting at Drumalee Cross where it was decided to start a club. The club was affiliated at the 1935 county convention and Charlie O'Reilly, Drumherrish, was its delegate to the county board. That year it entered a club in the junior championship which was run on a home and away league basis. Lacken, Kilmore, Butlersbridge and Ashgrove were in their division.

The first outing of the club was against Lacken. They wore all-white jerseys and were afterwards frequently referred to in match reports as the 'Lily Whites'-a title applied to the famous Kildare team of the 'twenties and early 'thirties. They were hand-knitted woolen jerseys and one old veteran who wore this white jersey with distinction recalled that on a hot day 'you would suffocate in it and after it was washed once or twice it wouldn't fit a child'. They got off to a good start beating Lacken by 1-4 to 1-1 in what the Anglo-Celt described as a 'bright clean game'.

The most successful year in the club's history was in 1969 when they won the Intermediate League and Championship and earned promotion to senior ranks for the first time. They defeated a fancied Arva team in the Championships by 1-9 to 1-6. A large crowd turned up in bad weather for the final on 5 December. They were rewarded with plenty of good football despite the bad conditions. Drumalee were a point behind at half-time after playing against the wind. They served up great football in the second half to win by 1-9 to 1-6.

Drumalee regained their senior status in 2006 winning the Cavan Intermediate Football Championship. But soon they lost their Senior Status. The regained it again in 2010 beating Drumlane 1-11 to 0-08. 
Drumalee is also one of the smallest clubs in cavan. As the area is taken up by killygarry, cavan gaels , ballyhaise and butlersbridge. The players they still try to keep the club going strong.

The Kit
Traditionally Drumalee have always worn a white strip with black trims, hence the Nickname "The Lily Whites".

Honours
 Cavan Intermediate Football Championship: 3
 1969, 2006, 2010

See also
Cavan Senior Football Championship

References

External links
Drumalee Website
Official Cavan GAA Website
Cavan Club GAA

Gaelic games clubs in County Cavan
Gaelic football clubs in County Cavan